Eleanor Smith may refer to:

Eleanor Smith (politician) (born 1957), British Labour Party MP
Lady Eleanor Smith (1902–1945), English writer
Eleanor Smith (activist) (1822–1896), Irish educational activist
Eleanor Smith (suffragist) (1828–1913), New Zealand suffragist and magazine editor
Eleanor Sophia Smith (1858–1942), American composer and educator

See also
Elinor Smith (1911–2010), pioneering American aviator, known as "The Flying Flapper of Freeport"
Rosalynn Carter (born Eleanor Rosalynn Smith, 1927)
Ella Smith (disambiguation)
Ellen Smith (disambiguation)
Helen Smith (disambiguation)
Elenore Smith Bowen, pen name of American cultural anthropologist Laura Bohannan (1922–2002)
Ellie Smith, 2014 winner of Miss Nevada